= Steuben point =

The Steuben point is a type of Native American arrowhead from the Middle Woodland to Late Woodland period found in what later became the United States.

It is a stone tool point found throughout central Illinois and the surrounding Midwest. These points have a slightly convex blade, expanding stem, and straight base that sometimes exhibit basal grinding. The point type is technologically related to Snyders and Ansell points.
